Oliver is an unincorporated community in Scott County, in the U.S. state of Arkansas.

History
A post office called Oliver was established in 1903, and remained in operation until 1932. The community most likely was named after the local Oliver family of settlers.

References

Unincorporated communities in Arkansas
Unincorporated communities in Scott County, Arkansas